Wolfe Glick (born December 6, 1995), also known as Wolfey or WolfeyVGC, is an American competitive Pokémon player, streamer and YouTuber. He is the 2016 World Champion of the official Pokémon Video Game Championships (VGC) format, and has won numerous other VGC competitions.  Glick was also one of the first several people to have completed a Hardcore Nuzlocke of Emerald Kaizo, along with Pokémon Challenges. 

Glick has been called one of the best VGC players of all time, and his unique strategies often strongly influence the metagame. His YouTube channel, WolfeyVGC, posts videos about competitive Pokémon content.

Education 
Glick has degrees in Economics and Computational Modelling and Data Analytics from Virginia Tech. Before making competitive Pokémon his career, Glick worked as a government analyst.

Competitive Pokémon 
Glick made his debut into competitive Pokémon in 2011 as a freshman in high school. He made it to the World Championships, placing 6th overall. He won the Washington, D.C. Regionals and US Nationals in Indianapolis to qualify.

Following his 2nd placing at the 2012 World Championships, Glick's team was added into the Pokémon World Tournament facility in the Pokémon Black 2 and White 2 games. Accessible via an optional download, the "2012 Masters Division Challenge" allowed players to battle against an in-game trainer with his team. The battle followed the same ruleset as the 2012 VGC format.

In 2016, while attending Virginia Tech, Glick won the Pokémon VGC World Championships, collecting $10,000 in prize money. This achievement is generally regarded as the peak of his VGC career. Glick played Johnathan Evans in the 2016 finals and beat him 2–0 in their best of 3 set, being crowned the World Champion.

From 2011 to 2018, he qualified for Worlds every year, qualifying again in 2022. After he won the 2019 North American International Championships, Glick became the first player to win a Regional, National, International and World Championship. Additionally, Glick has qualified the most times for World Championships,  reached the most top cuts (round of 24) at World Championships and has played in two world finals (the only other person to ever do so is Ray Rizzo).

Following his 2020 Players Cup II win, one of Glick's Pokémon, a Coalossal, was distributed via Mystery Gift.

Esports teams 
In 2018, Glick joined the esports team Panda Global, departing in 2021. Glick joined the competitive Pokémon section of the esports team Beastcoast in 2022.

Tournament placings 
Glick often—though not always—achieves high placings in tournaments:

Regional Championships

National Championships

World Championships

Other Events

References

External links 
Official website of Beastcoast

Living people
Pokémon video game players
American esports players
Gaming YouTubers
American YouTubers
1995 births